Johannes Hiob (23 June 1884 in Tallinn – 27 September 1937 in Tallinn) was an Estonian politician. He was a member of the V Riigikogu, representing the Estonian Socialist Workers' Party. He was a member of the Riigikogu since 3 July 1934. He replaced Johannes Kraan. Later, he resigned his position and he was replaced by Arnold Lainevool.

References

1884 births
1937 deaths
People from Tallinn
People from Kreis Harrien
Estonian Socialist Workers' Party politicians
Members of the Riigikogu, 1932–1934